The 2010 International Bowl was the fourth and final edition of the college football bowl game, and was played at Rogers Centre in Toronto, Ontario, Canada.  The game started at 12:00 PM US EST on Saturday, January 2, 2010. The game was telecast on ESPN2 and the South Florida Bulls defeated the Northern Illinois Huskies 27–3.

Both teams played in their first International Bowl.  South Florida played in their fifth consecutive bowl game.  They were previously  2-2 in bowl games and were coming off a 41–14 victory over Memphis in the 2008 St. Petersburg Bowl.  Northern Illinois made its fourth bowl appearance in six years.  The Huskies were defeated 17–10 by Louisiana Tech in the previous years' Independence Bowl.

The game was the third meeting between the two schools.  In 2001, South Florida's first game as an NCAA Division I-A team was at Northern Illinois; NIU won 20–17 on a last-second field goal.  One year later, South Florida defeated the Huskies 37–6 in Tampa.

Game summary
Mike Ford ran for a career-high 207 yards and scored one touchdown, B. J. Daniels threw two scoring passes to A. J. Love, and South Florida beat Northern Illinois 27–3 in the International Bowl.  Carlton Mitchell caught six passes for 94 yards for the Bulls, who won back-to-back bowls for the first time.  South Florida scored 24 unanswered points in the second half after the teams traded field goals in a dreary first half.

It's the third straight year a Big East running back has topped 200 yards in the International Bowl. Ray Rice of Rutgers turned pro after rushing for a game-record 280 yards and four touchdowns in 2007, while Connecticut's Donald Brown ran for 261 yards in last year's game.

Northern Illinois running back Chad Spann carried 20 times for 93 yards, giving him 1,038 for the season.  However, the USF defense came up big all day giving up only 238 yards of offense for the game.

Scoring summary

References

External links

 Official International Bowl website

International Bowl
International Bowl
South Florida Bulls football bowl games
Northern Illinois Huskies football bowl games
2010 in Canadian sports
January 2010 sports events in Canada
International Bowl